Peter Chebet Kiprono (born 24 June 1974) is a Kenyan long-distance runner.

He was second at the 2003 San Diego Marathon and finished fourth at the Chicago Marathon in a personal best time of 2:08:43. A fourth-place finish at the 2005 Paris Marathon was followed by a runner-up performances at the 2006 Vienna Marathon (2:08:56).

Achievements

Personal bests
Marathon - 2:08.43 hrs (2003)

External links

1974 births
Living people
Kenyan male long-distance runners
Kenyan male marathon runners
20th-century Kenyan people
21st-century Kenyan people